Blutaparon rigidum, sometimes known as the Galapagos amaranth, was a species of plant in the family Amaranthaceae. It was endemic to the Galápagos Islands in Ecuador.

References

Amaranthaceae
Endemic flora of Ecuador
Extinct plants
Taxonomy articles created by Polbot